The Composite UI Application Block (or CAB) is an addition to Microsoft's .NET Framework for creating complex user interfaces made of loosely coupled components. Developed by Microsoft's patterns & practices team, CAB is used exclusively for developing Windows Forms. A derivative version of CAB exists in both the Web Client and Mobile Client Software Factories as well. It encourages the developer to use either the Model-View-Controller or Model-View-Presenter architectural pattern, to encourage reuse of the individual User Controls (referred to in CAB as "SmartParts") by not coupling them with their underlying data elements or presentation code.

It is part of the foundation of the Smart Client Software Factory, another patterns & practices deliverable. It is also part of the Mobile Client Software Factory which is a version of the Smart Client Software Factory for use with the .NET Compact Framework 2.0.

See also 
 Software Factories

External links 
 CAB Home page
 Smart Client Software Factory Home page

Microsoft software factories
Software architecture